Joseph David Reitman  (born May 25, 1968) is an American actor, producer, director, and writer.

Early life
Joe Reitman grew up in Brookline, Massachusetts, and majored in theatre at Pitzer College in Claremont, California, in order to pursue a career in entertainment. He is Jewish and a quarter Irish.

Career
Reitman was quickly cast in movie and TV roles and was brought to prominence by his recurring role as Kelly Bundy's boyfriend on Married... with Children. Notable film credits include The Perfect Storm, Lady in the Water''', Clueless and Jay and Silent Bob Strike Back. Reitman wrote a story for Marvel Comics' Spider-Man Unlimited #14 titled "S.C.U.D.S", published in Spring 2006.

Poker
Reitman has played at the World Series of Poker four times and won UltimateBet.com's $1 Million Guaranteed Tournament. He has also played in numerous charity tournaments.

Personal life
In 2002, Reitman married actress Shannon Elizabeth. In March 2005, the couple announced their separation. They remain friends, and he currently manages her theatrical career. Together, they founded Animal Avengers, a nonprofit organization for animal rights.

In 2006, Reitman began dating professional poker player Annie Duke. They got engaged in 2010. The couple broke up in 2012.

 Filmography 
Actor

Producer
 Ten Inch Hero (2007)
 Annie Duke Takes on the World (2006)

Director
 Survivin' the Island (2002)

Writer
 Survivin' the Island'' (2002)

References

External links
 

1968 births
American male film actors
Living people
People from Brookline, Massachusetts
Male actors from Boston